Severozápad (Northwest) is a statistical area of the Nomenclature of Territorial Units for Statistics, level NUTS 2. It includes the Karlovy Vary Region and Ústí nad Labem Region.

It covers an area of 8 649 km2 and 1,120,654 inhabitants (population density 130 inhabitants/km2).

Economy 
The Gross domestic product (GDP) of the region was 15.2 billion € in 2018, accounting for 7.3% of Czech economic output. GDP per capita adjusted for purchasing power was 19,200 € or 64% of the EU27 average in the same year. The GDP per employee was also 64% of the EU average.

See also
NUTS of the Czech Republic

References

NUTS 2 statistical regions of the European Union
Subdivisions of the Czech Republic